Carlos Tünnerman Bernheim (born May 10, 1933) is a Nicaraguan lawyer, diplomat, government official and educator. He is a former Minister of Education in Nicaragua, serving during the Sandinista National Liberation Front (FSLN) government from 1979 to 1984. He next became Nicaragua’s ambassador to the United States and then to the Organization of American States (OAS), from 1984 to 1988.

Tünnerman’s father had been head of the Nicaraguan Central Bank. A lawyer by training, Tünnerman defended Tomás Borge after the 1956 assassination of President Anastasio Somoza Garcia. From 1964 to 1974, Tünnerman was rector of the National Autonomous University of Nicaragua at León. There he met eventual human rights lawyer and Nicaraguan Center for Human Rights president  Vilma Núñez as well as his successor as rector and later president of Nicaragua’s Supreme Electoral Council Mariano Fiallos Oyanguren.

In 1977, Tünnerman was a member of the  Group of Twelve establishment figures in Nicaragua who signed a letter of support for the Sandinistas, helping legitimize the movement.

Tünnerman was twice awarded a Guggenheim Fellowship in education, in 1973 and 1989.

On February 25, 2020, Tünnerman was a signatory to the proclamation of unity of the National Coalition. The signatory organizations pledged to work to develop a unified opposition to mount an electoral challenge to Daniel Ortega, following years of protest in the country. The other representatives signing the document were Jesús Tefel, Medardo Mairena, George Henriquez, Saturnino Cerrato, Luis Fley, and María Haydee Osuna.

Personal life
Tünnerman married Rosa Carlota Pereira.

Books

References

Sandinista National Liberation Front politicians
20th-century Nicaraguan lawyers
Nicaraguan diplomats
Nicaraguan writers
Living people
1933 births